Ursula Sapp-Möckel (born 5 October 1951) is a German diver. She competed at the 1972 Summer Olympics and the 1976 Summer Olympics.

References

1951 births
Living people
German female divers
Olympic divers of West Germany
Divers at the 1972 Summer Olympics
Divers at the 1976 Summer Olympics
Sportspeople from Arnsberg (region)
21st-century German women
20th-century German women
People from Hochsauerlandkreis